McWeeny is a surname. Notable people with the surname include:

Doug McWeeny (1896–1953), American baseball player
Roy McWeeny (1924–2021), English physicist and academic